Julio Lamilla (died 31 March 2016) was a Chilean biologist, researcher and conservationist. Lamilla was a former student of Liceo Armando Robles Rivera in Valdivia before graduating from the Austral University of Chile in Biology and Chemistry in which he majored in Zoology.

He became a teacher and researcher at the university in 1979 and held numerous posts through his life as a conservationist and shark expert. He died of a heart attack in March 2016. Dipturus lamillai, a species of skate first described in 2019, was named in Lamilla's honour.

References

Academic staff of the Austral University of Chile
Chilean marine biologists
People from Valdivia
2016 deaths
Year of birth missing
Austral University of Chile alumni